Ivaylo Gueorguiev Yordanov (born 11 April 1966) is a Bulgarian wrestler. He competed in the men's Greco-Roman 90 kg at the 1992 Summer Olympics.

References

1966 births
Living people
Bulgarian male sport wrestlers
Olympic wrestlers of Bulgaria
Wrestlers at the 1992 Summer Olympics
People from Vratsa